Martin Nakell is an American poet and author.

Biography 

Winner of the Gertrude Stein Award in Poetry for 1996–1997 and an NEA Interarts Grant, he was also a finalist for the America's Award in Fiction, 1997 (for The Library of Thomas Rivka), a finalist in the New American Poetry Series for 1999.

Nakell has published poetry and fiction extensively in journals, including recent publications of poetry in Proliferations (San Francisco), Ribot (Los Angeles), ReMap (Boston and Los Angeles), and fiction in Literal Latte (New York), Hanging Loose (New York), Hyper Age (San Francisco), Subvoicity (London). Three chapters from Two Fields That Face and Mirror Each Other have been published in literary journals, including Washington Review and Onyx.

He has held fellowships from the Fine Arts Work Center, Provincetown (poetry), from the Blue Mountain Center (fiction and screenwriting), from Writers and Books (poetry and fiction), from the State University of New York at Albany; he has received grants from the National Endowment for the Arts, from Chapman University, from the University of California. He was a panelist for the America Awards in fiction for 1998, a panelist for the Los Angeles Arts Commission in 1999, and serves on the panel of the "100 Most Important Books of the Twentieth Century" for The Encyclopedia of Twentieth Century Literature of The Contemporary Arts Educational Project, Inc. Recently, Visual Poetics, Inc., a Los Angeles film company, optioned three of his short stories (Ramon; Thomas; Monsieur B., the Irish Poet), for a film entitled A Heisenberg Trilogy.

Martin Nakell earned a Doctorate of Arts from the State University of New York at Albany, and is Professor of Literature at Chapman University, and Visiting Professor in Creative Writing at the University of California at San Diego.

He is married to novelist Rebecca Goodman.

Works

Poetry

 The Myth of Creation (Parentheses Writing Series, 1993)
 Form (Spuyten Duyvil, 2005)

Fiction 

 Ramon (Jahbone Press, 1983)
 The Library of Thomas Rivka (Sun & Moon Press, 1996)
 Two Fields That Face & Mirror Each Other (Green Integer, 2001)
 Goings (Margin-to-Margin Books, 2002)
 Settlement (Spuyten Duyvil, 2007)

External links
Spuyten Duyvil
New York State Writers Institute
The East Village

Work samples
from Settlement
"On Narrativity"
"Ox"

Living people
Year of birth missing (living people)
American male poets
American male novelists